Sparse principal component analysis (sparse PCA) is a specialised technique used in statistical analysis and, in particular, in the analysis of multivariate data sets. It extends the classic method of principal component analysis (PCA) for the reduction of dimensionality of data by introducing sparsity structures to the input variables.

A particular disadvantage of ordinary PCA is that the principal components are usually linear combinations of all input variables.  Sparse PCA overcomes this disadvantage by finding linear combinations that contain just a few input variables.

Contemporary datasets often have the number of input variables comparable with or even much larger than the number of samples. It has been shown that if  does not converge to zero, the classical PCA is not consistent. 
But sparse PCA can retain consistency even if

Mathematical formulation 
Consider a data matrix, where each of the  columns represent an input variable, and each of the  rows represents an independent sample from data population.

The first constraint specifies that v is a unit vector. In the second constraint,  represents the  pseudo-norm of v, which is defined as the number of its non-zero components. So the second constraint specifies that the number of non-zero components in v is less than or equal to k, which is typically an integer that is much smaller than dimension p.

If one takes k=p, the problem reduces to the ordinary PCA, and the optimal value becomes the largest eigenvalue of covariance matrix Σ.

After finding the optimal solution v, one deflates Σ to obtain a new matrix

and iterate this process to obtain further principal components. However, unlike PCA, sparse PCA cannot guarantee that different principal components are orthogonal. In order to achieve orthogonality, additional constraints must be enforced.

The following equivalent definition is in matrix form.
Let  be a p×p symmetric matrix, one can rewrite the sparse PCA problem as

Tr is the matrix trace, and  represents the non-zero elements in matrix V.
The last line specifies that V has matrix rank one and is positive semidefinite.

Moreover, the rank constraint in this formulation is actually redundant, and therefore sparse PCA can be cast as the following mixed-integer semidefinite program

Because of the cardinality constraint, the maximization problem is hard to solve exactly, especially when dimension p is high.

Algorithms for Sparse PCA 
Several alternative approaches (of ) have been proposed, including
 a regression framework,
 a penelized matrix decomposition framework,
 a convex relaxation/semidefinite programming framework,
 a generalized power method framework
 an alternating maximization framework
 forward-backward greedy search and exact methods using branch-and-bound techniques,
 a certifiably optimal branch-and-bound approach
 Bayesian formulation framework.
 A certifiably optimal mixed-integer semidefinite branch-and-cut approach 
The methodological and theoretical developments of Sparse PCA as well as its applications in scientific studies are recently reviewed in a survey paper.

Notes on Semidefinite Programming Relaxation 

It has been proposed that sparse PCA can be approximated by semidefinite programming (SDP). If one drops the rank constraint and relaxes the cardinality constraint by a 1-norm convex constraint, one gets a semidefinite programming relaxation, which can be solved efficiently in polynomial time:

In the second constraint,  is a p×1 vector of ones, and |V| is the matrix whose elements are the absolute values of the elements of V.

The optimal solution  to the relaxed problem  is not guaranteed to have rank one. In that case,  can be truncated to retain only the dominant eigenvector.

While the semidefinite program does not scale beyond n=300 covariates, it has been shown that a second-order cone relaxation of the semidefinite relaxation is almost as tight and successfully solves problems with n=1000s of covariates

Applications

Financial Data Analysis 
Suppose ordinary PCA is applied to a dataset where each input variable represents a different asset, it may generate principal components that are weighted combination of all the assets. In contrast, sparse PCA would produce principal components that are weighted combination of only a few input assets, so one can easily interpret its meaning. Furthermore, if one uses a trading strategy based on these principal components, fewer assets imply less transaction costs.

Biology 
Consider a dataset where each input variable corresponds to a specific gene. Sparse PCA can produce a principal component that involves only a few genes, so researchers can focus on these specific genes for further analysis.

High-dimensional Hypothesis Testing 
Contemporary datasets often have the number of input variables comparable with or even much larger than the number of samples. It has been shown that if  does not converge to zero, the classical PCA is not consistent.
the optimal value does not converge to the largest eigenvalue of data population when the sample size , and the optimal solution does not converge to the direction of maximum variance.
But sparse PCA can retain consistency even if 

The k-sparse largest eigenvalue (the optimal value of ) can be used to discriminate an isometric model, where every direction has the same variance, from a spiked covariance model in high-dimensional setting. Consider a hypothesis test where the null hypothesis specifies that data  are generated from a multivariate normal distribution with mean 0 and covariance equal to an identity matrix, and the alternative hypothesis specifies that data  is generated from a spiked model with signal strength :

where  has only k non-zero coordinates. The largest k-sparse eigenvalue can discriminate the two hypothesis if and only if .

Since computing k-sparse eigenvalue is NP-hard, one can approximate it by the optimal value of semidefinite programming relaxation. If that case, we can discriminate the two hypotheses if . The additional  term cannot be improved by any other polynomial time algorithm if the planted clique conjecture holds.

Software/source code 
 amanpg - R package for Sparse PCA using the Alternating Manifold Proximal Gradient Method 
 elasticnet – R package for Sparse Estimation and Sparse PCA using Elastic-Nets 
 nsprcomp - R package for sparse and/or non-negative PCA based on thresholded power iterations
 scikit-learn – Python library for machine learning which contains Sparse PCA and other techniques in the decomposition module.

References 

Dimension reduction
Machine learning algorithms